The  is a  railway line operated by West Japan Railway Company (JR West) in western Japan, connecting Iwakuni Station in Iwakuni, Yamaguchi, and Kushigahama Station in Shūnan, Yamaguchi. The line was originally built as a more direct route between its termini than the original Sanyo Main Line (see History section below) and the Sanyo Shinkansen is more closely aligned to this line than the Sanyo Main Line in this section.

Operations
Trains operating on this line continue from Kushigahama Station to Tokuyama Station on the Sanyo Main Line.

Stations

Morigahara Junction

 between Kawanishi and Hashirano Stations is the point where the Nishikigawa Seiryū Line diverges from the Gantoku Line. Between this junction and Kawanishi Station, the two lines share the same track.

History

The line was originally built to shorten the Sanyo Main Line along the old San'yōdō. The 3.7 km Iwakuni to Marifu (now Nishi-Iwakuni) section opened in 1929, and the 3.9 km Kushigahama to Suo-Hanaoka section opened in 1932. The remaining 36 km section, including the 3,149 m Kinmeiji tunnel (and six others) opened in 1934, at which time the line became part of the Sanyo Main Line, at that time being the only remaining single line section.

In 1944, the original Sanyo alignment via Yanai was double-tracked and reinstated as the Sanyo Main Line, at which time this line became formally known as the Gantoku Line.

Freight services ceased in 1974, and CTC signalling was commissioned on the entire line in 1982.

References

Gantoku Line
Lines of West Japan Railway Company
Rail transport in Yamaguchi Prefecture
1067 mm gauge railways in Japan
Railway lines opened in 1929
1929 establishments in Japan